The Hagiography of St. Simeon, or Life of Stefan Nemanja, is a hagiography (or biography) of Serbian Grand Prince Stefan Nemanja (St. Simeon), authored by Archbishop Sava, his son, in 1208. It is the oldest known Serbian hagiography and biography.

In the Hilandar Typikon, Sava included the Short Hagiography of St. Simeon Nemanja, which tells of Simeon's life between his arrival at Hilandar and death. It was written immediately after his death, in 1199 or 1200. The developed hagiography on St. Simeon was written in the introduction of the Studenica Typikon (1208). It was made according to the rules of Byzantine literature. The hagiography itself, biography of a saint, was one of the main prose genres in Byzantium. Hagiographies were written to create or spread the cult of the saint, and communicated the qualities of and virtues of the person in question. The work focused on the monastic character of Simeon, using biographical information as a subset to his renouncing of the throne, power and size in the world for the Kingdom of Heaven. Simeon is portrayed as a dramatic example of renouncing earthly life, as a representative of basic evangelical teachings and foundations of these, especially of monastic spirituality. His biographical pre-history (conquests and achievements) with praises are merged in the prelude, followed by his monastic feats and his death, ending with a prayer instead of praise. The language is direct and simple, without excessive rhetorics, in which a close witness and companion, participant in the life of St. Simeon, is recognized (in Sava).

See also
Service to St. Simeon, divine service written by Sava

References

Sources

External links

Medieval Serbian literature
13th century in Serbia
1208
1200s books
Nemanjić dynasty
History of the Serbian Orthodox Church
Books about monarchs
13th-century history books
Serbian manuscripts
Cyrillic manuscripts
Christian hagiography
Saint Sava